This is a list of compositions by Carl Czerny.
Czerny composed a large number of pieces (up to Op. 861), including piano music (études, nocturnes, 11 sonatas, opera theme arrangements and variations) and also masses and choral music, 6 symphonies, concertos, songs, string quartets and other chamber music. Czerny himself divided his music into four categories: 
studies and exercises
easy pieces for students
brilliant pieces for concerts
serious music.

By opus number

 Op. 1, Variations Concertantes pour Pianoforte et Violon sur un thème de Jean-Baptiste Krumpholz
 Op. 2, Brilliant Rondeau on Cavatine de Carafa à quatre mains
 Op. 3, Brilliant Fantasy and Variations on "Romance of Blangini" with Accompanied two Violins, Alto, and Violoncello (Double Bass ad lib.)
 Op. 4, Le Souvenir, Variations
 Op. 5, Grand Rondeau n° 1, en ut majeur
 Op. 6, Waltz or Exercises
 Op. 7, Sonata No. 1 in A (published by Artaria) (1810),
 Op. 8, Amicitiae, Andantino con Variazione
 Op. 9, Brilliant Variations and easy (Theme favorite)
 Op. 10, Brilliant Grand Sonata in C minor, for four hands
 Op. 11, Brilliant Divertissement, for four hands
 Op. 12, Variations (Trauer-Walzer D. 365 No . 2 by F. Schubert) Solo and Duet
 Op. 13, Sonata No. 2 in A minor (published by Diabelli)
 Op. 14, Brilliant Variations on an Austrian Waltz
 Op. 15, Recreation for the Carnival, Brilliant Choice of Waltz and easy; two books
 Op. 16, Introduction and Variations on "O cara memoria," with Vcello. Acct. ad lib.
 Op. 17, Brilliant Rondo on a favorite Menuet of C. Kreutzer, for piano six hands
 Op. 18, Brilliant Grande Polonaise with an accompaniment for a second Pianoforte, or for a Quartett, both ad lib.
 Op. 19, Variations of a Barcarole favorite
 Op. 20, Introduction and Variations on a Marche favorite della Donna del Lago
 Op. 21, Introductions and Variations on a Cav.(Cavatine?) Favorite "Sorte secondami"
 Op. 22, Rondino No. 1 on "Cara attendimi," with Quartett Accompaniments ad lib.
 Op. 23, Brilliant Rondo No. 2, for 4 hands, in G
 Op. 24, Presto caratteristico, Duet in A minor
 Op. 25, Brilliant Variations on "Ah come nancondere" for 4 hands
 Op. 26, Rondo quasi Capriccio, in E
 Op. 27, Fantasy in B
 Op. 28, Grand Concerto for piano in F, with Orchestral accompaniments
 Op. 29, Rondino No. 2 on a Theme de l'Opera Corradino
 Op. 30, Rondino No. 3 on a Theme de l'Opera Armida
 Op. 31, 3 Fugues
 Fugue in F
 Fugue in E minor
 Fugue in C
 Op. 32, New Year's gifts, 24 Waltzes
 Op. 33, La Ricordanza, Variazioni sopra un Tema di Rode
 Op. 34, Duet for the Pianoforte for 4 hands, according to the first Trio of Mayseder
 Op. 35, Waltz di Bravura
 Op. 36, Impromptus on Brilliant Variations on Cotillon de Ballet Arsena
 Op. 37, Fantasy followed by a Romance varied
 Op. 38, First Grand Potpourri Concerto for two Pianoforte for 6 hands
 Op. 39, Rondino No. 4 on a Theme by Fesca
 Op. 40, Brilliant Variations on Ballet La Danseuse d'Arthere, for 4 hands
 Op. 41, Rondino No. 5 on a Theme by Beethoven
 Op. 42, Rondino No. 6 on an original Theme, Rondino No. 6, ‘Les Jours Passées’ on an original theme in E
 Op. 43, Brilliant Divertissement No. 2 on a Cav. "Aure felice," for 4 hands
 Op. 44, Romance of Beethoven arranged as a Brilliant Rondo, for 4 hands
 Op. 45, Charms of Baden, Rondo Pastoral
 Op. 46, Variations on a Bohemian Air
 Op. 47, Grand Exercise in bravura in the form of Brilliant Rondo
 Op. 48, "Die Schiffende," Song with Pianoforte, accompanied words by Holtz
 Op. 49, Two Brilliant Sonatinas
 Sonatina in C
 Sonatina in F
 Op. 50, Two Brilliant Sonatinas for 4 hands
 Sonatina in G
 Sonatina in C
 Op. 51, Two Brilliant Sonatinas, for Pianoforte and Violin
 Sonatina in B
 Sonatina in G
 Op. 52, Variations in an easy style on the Air from Die Fee aus Frankreich
 Op. 53, Rondoletto scherzando in C
 Op. 54, Brilliant and Characteristic Overture in B minor, for 4 hands,
 Op. 55, Charms of Friendship, Theme of Beethoven
 Op. 56, Introduction and Variations on the first Galoppe
 Op. 57, Grande Sonata No. 3, in F minor (published by Peters) (1824)
 Op. 58, Legerrazza e Bravura, Brilliant Rondo, with Quartett accompaniment
 Op. 59, Introduction and Brilliant Variations on a Rondo and Marche favorite of Roland
 Op. 60, Introduction, Variations and Rondo on C. M. von Weber's Hunting Chorus from the opera Euryanthe, with Orchestral Accompaniments (Wien : S.A. Steiner, 1824)
 Op. 61, Preludes, Cadences, and a short Fantasia in a brilliant style
 Op. 62, Caprice and Variations on "An Alexis" by Himmel
 Op. 63, Brilliant and easy Toccatine on Tarrantelle of the Ballet Die Fee und der Ritter
 Op. 64, Fantasy in the modern style on Potpourri
 Op. 65, Sonata No. 4 in G (published by Kistner)
 Op. 66, Rondo and Waltz in C
 Op. 67, Concert Variations followed by a Hunting Rondo on the walk of the Ballet, Barbe Bleu, for 4 hands
 Op. 68, Passionate Rondo
 Op. 69, Allegretto grazioso sopra un Tema de Ballo, Barbe Bleu
 Op. 70, Romance for Pianoforte, in D
 Op. 71, Brilliant Nocturne for "Das waren mir selige Tage," for 4 hands
 Op. 72, 2 Nice Rondos
 Nice Rondo in C
 Nice Rondo in G
 Op. 73, Variations on "Gott erhalte Franz den Kaiser", for piano with quartet or orchestral accompaniments (1824)
 Op. 74, Brilliant Rondoletto in E
 Op. 75, 3 Grand Allegros
 Grand Allegro in G
 Grand Allegro in B minor
 Grand Allegro in A
 Op. 76, Sonata No. 5 in E (published by Diabelli)
I. Allegro molto moderato ed espressivo
II. Andante cantabile (B major)
III. Scherzo Presto
IV. Andantino con variazioni (5 Variations and coda)
V. Finale Toccatina (Allo. moderato)
 Op. 77, "God save the King," with Variations
 Op. 78, Concerto for Fortepiano and Orchestra, in C
 Op. 79, 3 Grand Marches, solo and duet
 Grand Marche in C
 Grand Marche in D
 Grand Marche in E
 Op. 80, Introduction and 7 Variations, Concerto for Pianoforte, and Flute (or Violin)
 Op. 81, Variations on Marche Anglais
 Op. 82, Grand Exercise for Pianoforte, in F minor
 Op. 83, Romance from W. Scott's "Fraulein vorn See" for a Voice with Pianoforte accompaniment
 Op. 84, Grand Potpourri No. 2 for 6 hands
 Op. 85, 3 Polonaises
 Op. 86, Introduction, Variationen und Finale über den beliebten Baierischen Volksgesang
 Op. 87, Introduction et variations faciles pour le pianoforte à quatre mains sur un walse de Mr. le Comte de Gallenberg (Leipzig : H.A. Probst, 1825)
 Op. 88, Septième rondino pour le piano-forte : sur un motif de l'opéra Elisa e Claudio de Mercadante (Hannover, C. Bachmann, 1825)
 Op. 89, Capriccio à la fuga per il pianoforte
 Op. 90, Six rondeaux mignons: pour le piano-forte à quatre mains, à l'usage des elèves avancés (Hannover, C. Bachmann, 1826)
 Op. 91, Variations sur l’air allemand "Es ritten drei Reiter zum Thore hinaus, Ade"
 Op. 92, Toccata ou exercice pour la pianoforte in C major
 Op. 93, Rondo espressivo in E major
 Op. 94, 2 Grand Marches for Piano 4-Hands
 Op. 95, Notturno brillant (in E major, for piano, violin, viola, violoncello, flute, clarinet, horn, bassoon, and double bass)
 Op. 96, Rondino No.8 on an Original Theme (alla Polacca)
 Op. 97, Neuvième rondino (de Chasse)
 Op. 98, Dixième rondino sur un motif de W. A. Mozart pour le piano-forte
 Op. 99, Rondino No.11 on a Theme of Haydn
 Op. 100, Douzième rondino (militaire) pour le piano-forte seul; sur un motif de L. Cherubini
 Op. 101, Grand march for four hands at one piano, composed for the Coronation of the Empress Caroline of Austria (Published by J. Balls of London around 1826)
 Op. 102, Rondeau brillante No.3 for Piano 4-Hands (Steiner) - Reviewed in AMZ 1826/544
 Op. 103, Variations brillante sur un Air militaire française
 Op. 104, Trois Sonatines faciles et brillantes pour le pianoforte seul ou avec accomp: d'un violon et violoncelle ad libitum
 Op. 105, Trio no. 1 in E for piano, violin, and horn (or cello)
 Op. 106, Introduction & Variations on an Original Theme for Piano 4-Hands
 Op. 107, Rondeau Brillante dans le Style Francaise in D minor
 Op. 108, Caprice in E minor
 Op. 109, 5 Unvergangliche Blumchen for Voice & Piano
 Op. 110, Décaméron musical - Not the same with opp. 111
 Op. 111, Zwei Romanzen für Klavier zu drei Händen (part of a larger Decameron Musicale?)
 Op. 112, Galoppe varié No.2
 Op. 113, Variations on an Original Theme
 Op. 114, Valse variée pour le piano-forte
 Op. 115, Easy Variations on a Theme from the Farce, Staberl's Reise Abentheuer in Frankfort and Munchen
 Op. 116, Rondeau brillant for piano four hands
 Op. 117, 3 Rondeaux: Tendress, Amitie, & Confiance
 Op. 118, Grande polonaise brillante pour le piano-forte (with string quartet ad libitum, according to Chez Richault edition at U. Michigan libraries.)
 Op. 119, Sonate militaire et brillante pour le pianoforte à 4 mains avec accompagnement de violon et violoncelle ad libitum, composée à l’usage des élèves avancés. (1826)
 Op. 120, Sonate sentimentale pour le pianoforte à quatre mains (1826)
 Op. 121, Sonate pastorale (Also for piano four-hands, 1826)
 Op. 122, Grand Divertissement en forme de rondeau brillant with Orchestral Accompaniment
 Op. 123, Variations brillantes sur un thême Allemand favori
 Op. 124, Sonate für das Pianoforte. (No. 6 in D minor.) (Zurich: Nägeli, 1840s)
I. Introduzione
II. Capriccio appassionato
III. (no title, but All. con moto, vivace ma serioso)
IV. (Presto, scherzo)
V. Cantique de La bohème; Varié
VI. (Presto scherzando)
VII. Finale: Allegro con fuoco
 Op. 125, Variations brillantes on a Theme from the Opera 'Il Crociato' for Piano 4-Hands
 Op. 126, Grande serenade concertante for clarinet, horn, violoncello, and piano.
 Op. 127, Rondino sur un thême favori de l'opera Le maçon d'Auber. For piano quintet. (Vienna, Diabelli & Co.)
 Op. 128, Rondeau brillante in A major
 Op. 129, Duo concertant : in G-Dur, für Flöte oder Violoncello und Klavier
 Op. 130, Variations brillantes on 2 Themes from the Opera 'L'Ultimo Giorno di Pompei' for Piano 4-Hands
 Op. 131, Fantaisie élégante ou Potpourri brillant sur les thèmes favoris de lópéra: La dame blanche : comp. pour le pianoforte
 Op. 132, Variations brillantes sur le Duo favori "Dépéchons, travaillons = Ohne Rast, angefasst" de l'Opéra: Le Maçon (Der Maurer und der Schlosser) [de Daniel François Esprit Auber] pour le Piano-Forte à 4 mains
 Op. 133, Introduction & Variations on the Cavatine from the Opera 'L'Ultimo Giorno di Pompei'
 Op. 134, Impromptu or Variations on a Theme from 'Oberon'
 Op. 135, Variations on a Theme from the Opera 'Oberon' (Artaria)
 Op. 136, Sonatinas for piano four hands
 Op. 137, Allegro affetuoso for piano four hands (British Library) (pub. CF Peters around 1827.)
 Op. 138, Variations de Concert sur la Marche des Grecs de l’Opéra : le Siège de Corinthe
 Op. 139, Études (Übungstücke, or 100 Progressive Studies)
 Op. 140, Introductions & Variations on a Favorite Air from 'Das Madchen aus der Feenwelt'
 Op. 141, Variations on the Favorite Duet "Bruderlein Fein" for Piano 4-Hands
 Op. 142, Ouverture, orkest, nr.1, op.142. In C minor
 Op. 143, Seventh Piano Sonata in E minor (published by Kistner of Leipzig)
 Op. 144, Grande fantaisie en forme de sonate, sonata no. 8 in E, for piano
 Op. 145, Grande fantaisie en forme de sonate, sonata no. 9 in B minor (Richault, 1827)
 Op. 146, Marcia funèbre sulla morte di Luigi van Beethoven per il piano-forte solo
 Op. 147, Variations à capriccio on 2 Themes from the Opera 'Oberon' for Piano 4-Hands
 Op. 148, First piano quartet (Premier grand quatuor pour le piano-forte, violon, viola et violoncelle, Peters of Leipzig, pub. 1827)
 Op. 149, Rondoletto concertant: in F-dur für Pianoforte, Flöte und Violoncello ad lib
 Op. 150, Trois polonaises sentimentales
 Op. 151, Grand Exercice de trilles en forme de rondeau brillant
 Op. 152, Grand exercice (pub. by Ant. diabelli u.C. of Vienna)
 Op. 153, Concerto for piano four-hands and orchestra in C major
 Op. 154, Graduale Pastorale in F major, "Hodie Christus Natus Est", for 4 Voices, 2 Violins, Viola, 2 Clarinets, 2 Horns, Cello, Double Bass, & Organ
 Op. 155, Exsulta filia Sion : Offertorium pastorale : für vierstimmigen gemischten Chor, Streicher, 2 Oboen oder Klarinetten, 2 Trompeten, Pauken und Orgel, 2 Hörner ad lib.
 Op. 156, Belohnung der fleissigen Jugend : drei Sonatinen für's Piano-Forte
 Op. 157, Fantasia in A major, Der Brand von Maria-Zell
 Op. 158, Three sonatines for four-hands
 Op. 159, Rondeau brillant di bravura pour le piano-forte seul
 Op. 160, Introduction, variations and polacca after a theme from Bellini's "Il Pirata" for piano and orchestra (Published by Diabelli in Vienna around 1831)
 Op. 161, 48 Etudes in the Form of Preludes
 Op. 162, Fantaisie sur themes suisses et tiroliens
 Op. 163, Six sonatinas, piano
 Op. 164, Rondino No.14 sur "Ma Quell Amabile" (de l'opéra 'Il Pirata') (pub.1828, Richault)
 Op. 165, Grand Nocturne Brillant for Piano 4-Hands, with 2 horns ad lib
 Op. 166, Trio no. 2 in A for piano and strings (pub. about 1830)
I. Allegro; Scherzo: Molto Allegro
II. Trio (umoristico); Adagio sostenuto in D
III. attacca Allo agitato in A minor
IV. attacca
V. Allegretto piacevole in A major
 Op. 167, Sonatina for piano
 Op. 168, 2 Rondeaux
 Op. 169, Rondino No.15 on a Theme of Paganini
 Op. 170, Grandes variations brillantes pour le pianoforte à quatre mains sur le thême original favori colla campanella (Glöckchen Rondo) comp. et dediées à l'auteur du thême M.r N. Paganini
 Op. 171, Fantasy on 3 Themes by Haydn, Mozart & Beethoven for Timpani and Strings
 Op. 172, Gran Capriccio, in C minor
 Op. 173, Trio no. 3 in E (Troisième Grand Trio) for piano and strings (published by 1829)
 Op. 174, 14 Ecossaises brillantes
 Op. 175, Fantaisie-Rondo d'après l'Adelaide de Beethoven : pour le piano forte/Musical Décameron (Piano Solo version)
 Op. 176, Second Musical Décameron (Piano Duet version)
 Op. 177, Two fugues for string quintet
 Op. 178, Grande sonate in F minor for piano 4-hands,
 Op. 179, Introduction, Variations, & Polacca on 2 Favorite Airs from "Der Alpen Konig und der Menschenfried"
 Op. 180, Introduction & Variations on a Favorite Air from "Der Alpen Konig und der Menschenfried" (Solo & Duet Versions)
 Opus Numbers 181-192 are collectively entitled "12 Grand Rondeaux Nationaux Brillants et Caracteristiques"
 Op. 181, Rondeau national allemand
 Op. 182, Rondeau national anglois et eccossois
 Op. 183, Rondeau national bohéme
 Op. 184, Rondeau national espagnol
 Op. 185, Rondeau national francais
 Op. 186, Rondeau Hongrois
 Op. 187, Rondeau Italien
 Op. 188, Rondeau Polonois
 Op. 189, Rondeau Russe
 Op. 190, Rondeau Suedois
 Op. 191, Rondeau Suisse
 Op. 192, Rondeau Turque
 Op. 193, Troisième galoppe variée pour le piano-forte
 Op. 194, Introduction, Variations, & Rondo on 2 Favorite Styrian Alpine Airs (Solo & Duet Versions)
 Op. 195, Rondino No.16 sur 'Ah come rapida'
 Op. 196, Introduction, variations et rondo sur la cavatine (Or che son vicino a te) de Nicolini, pour le piano-forte avec accompagnement de deux violons, alto et violoncelle
 Op. 197, Variations brillantes pour un pianoforte à 6 manis concertantes (on a theme from Bellini's opera Norma)
 Op. 198, Rondino No.17 sur 'La Muette de Portici'
 Op. 199, Variations sur "Ach! ich Stell" du Falsche Dir (Solo & Duet Versions)
 Op. 200, A systematic introduction to improvisation on the pianoforte
 Op. 201, 6 Rondeaux d'amusement
 Op. 202, Introduction, variations brillantes et rondeau de chasse
 Op. 203, Valse Autrichienne
 Op. 204, Divertissement de concert, piano, orchestra (or: Divertissement de concert; ou, Adagio, variations et rondeau, pour le piano-forte avec accompagnement d'orchestre)
 Op. 205, Rondeau précedé d'une introduction comp. pour le pianoforte
 Op. 206, Theme Russe, variée
 Op. 207, Rondoletto sur le Theme Hollandis Favori, "Wien Neelands Bloed in de Aders Vloeit"
 Op. 208, Introduction et variations sur 'La muette de Portici'
 Op. 209, Divertissement
 Op. 210, Concertino for piano (and strings, flute, 2 oboes or clarinets, 2 bassoons, 2 horns, 2 trumpets and drums (ad libitum).) (Published by Haslinger of Vienna in the 1850s)
 Op. 211, Deux Trios brillans pour pianoforte, violon et violoncelle(publ. Diabelli, Vienna, about 1835)
 Op. 212, Six Grand Potpourris for piano trio
 Op. 213, Andante und rondo in C for orchestra (?) (published by Haslinger about 1833)
 Op. 214, Piano Concerto in A minor 
 Op. 215, Rondoletto Brillant sur Plusiers Motifs tires des Romances Francais
 Op. 216, Rondoletto Brillant on 2 Motifs from the Opera 'William Tell'
 Op. 217, Rondeau de chasse on "Quelle Savage Harmonie" from 'William Tell'
 Op. 218, Potpourri brilliant on Themes from Spohr’s Faust
 Op. 219, Introduction et variations sur le 'Pas de trois favori'
 Op. 220, Brilliant variations for the piano forte on the favorite tyrolienne in Rossini's celebrated opera Guillaume Tell (published in London: Goulding & D'almaine, [entre 1825 et 1832])
 Op. 221, 2 Grandes fantaisies sur les motifs de 'Guillaume Tell'
 in E minor
 in A major
 Op. 222, Impromptu brillant en [sic] non difficile pour le piano forte sur un pastorale de l'opéra Guillaume Tell
 Op. 222a, Variations in A major - version for piano and orchestra
 Op. 223, Variations Brillantes on "Das Wandern ist des Müllers Lust" by Schubert (Solo & Duet Versions)
 Op. 224, Deux Quatuors Brilliants (for piano quartet) (Deux quatuore brillans pour piano-forte, violon, alte et violoncelle)
 Op. 225, Variations Brillantes on a Romance from Ivanhoe's Opera 'Templar & Judinn' for Piano 4-Hands
 Op. 226, Fantaisie in F minor for piano duet : Allegro con spiritoso; Andantino; Scherzo; Presto; Allegro: Tempo I
 Opus Numbers 227-229 & 295-297 are part of the Collection "Les Pianistes Associes, ou Compositions Brillant et Concertant"
 Op. 227, Rondeau brillant op. 227 : für Klavier zu 6 Händen
 Op. 228, Variations Brillante on a Tyrolien Theme from the Opera 'La Fiancee' for Piano 6-Hands
 Op. 229, Divertissement militaire : für Klavier zu 6 Händen
 Op. 230, Quartet for four pianos in C (Quatuor concertant für vier Piano-Forte über mehrere beliebte Melodien. Diabelli, Vienna, 1830) (In one movement in several connected sections)
 Op. 230a, Morceau de concert très brillant sur des motif (sic) favoris pour le piano (pub.1831, Richault)
 Op. 231, Rondeaux mignons faciles et brillants sur divers motifs favoris : pour le piano
 Op. 232, Grandes variations di bravura sur deux motifs de l'Opéra 'Fra Diavolo' de D.F.E. Auber for piano and orchestra
 Op. 233, Rondo brillant in B major
 Op. 234, Introduction & Variations Brillantes sur la Marche dans "Gli Arabi nelle Gallie" for piano and orchestra
 Op. 235, Rondino No.18 on a Theme of Auber
 Op. 236, Introduction, grandes variations et finale sur une marone française
 Op. 237, Einzugs Marsch, Performed at the Opening of the Hungarian Diet, 13 Sept. 1830 (Solo & Duet Versions)
 Op. 238, March Performed on the Occasion of the Coronation of His Imperial Majesty Ferdinand as King of Hungary, 28 Sept. 1830 (Solo & Duet Versions)
 Op. 239, 50 Vierhändige Übungsstücke
 Op. 240, Fantasy Romantique No.1 on Sir Walter Scott's 'Roman Waverley' for Piano 4-Hands
 Op. 241, Fantasy Romantique No.2 on Sir Walter Scott's 'Guy Mannering' for Piano 4-Hands
 Op. 242, Fantasy Romantique No.3 on Sir Walter Scott's 'Ivanhoe' for Piano 4-Hands
 Op. 243, Fantasy Romantique No.4 on Sir Walter Scott's 'Rob Roy' for Piano 4-Hands
 Op. 244, Grand Exercice de la Gamme Chromatique avec toutes les Differentes Maruieres du Doigte
 Op. 245, Grand exercice Grand Exercice des Gammes en Tierces & des Passages Doubles
 Op. 246, Introduction, Variations, & Finale on a Choeur de l'Opera 'Fra Diavolo'
 Op. 247, Fantaisie sur les motifs favoris de l'opera I Puritani
 Op. 248, Introduction et variations concertantes sur un air tirolienne for horn or cello and piano
 Op. 249, Variations sur la valse Charmante : de Jean Strauss, le duc de Reichstadt varié pour le piano forte
 Op. 250, Festal March in A major
 Op. 251, Sonatine in G
 Op. 252, 3rd Decameron Musical, 10 Bks. for Piano 4-Hands
 Op. 253, Le Golfe de Naples, Tableau Nocturne ou Fanasie Pittoresque
 Op. 254, Grand rondeau brillant pour le pianoforte à 4 mains
 Op. 255, Rondeau a la Barcarolle in A major
 Op. 256, Fantasia concertante, für Klavier, Flöte und Violoncello in G major
 Op. 257, Grand polonaise in C major
 Op. 258, Deux thêmes originaux variés pour le pianoforte (Halle [ca. 1835])
 Op. 259, Grand rondeau militaire et brillant. For piano four-hands. (H. Helmuth in Halle, around 1833?)
 Op. 260, Rondo in F major
 Op. 261, 125 exercises. (Passagen-Übungen, piano. Pub. by Haslinger in four Volumes 1832 - 1838.)
 Op. 262, Three piano quartets. (Trois quatuors brillans et non difficiles pour le pianoforte, violon, alto et violoncello. Hoffmeister of Leipzig, about 1832)
 Op. 263, Variations precédés d'une introduction sur 'La fiancée'
 Op. 264, Introduzione ed allegro agitato in G minor for Piano Duet
 Op. 265, Rondeau précédé d'une introduction
 Op. 266, Variations Brillantes & non difficiles on a Original Valse for Piano 4-Hands
 Op. 267, Allegro en galopp in F major
 Op. 268, Piano sonata no. 10 Grande sonate d'étude in B♭
 Op. 269, Grande Polonaise Brillante for Piano 4-Hands
 Op. 270, 3 Thèmes originaux, variés
 Op. 271, La Joyeust et la Sentimentale, 2 Rondos
 Op. 272, Rondo Polacca
 Op. 273, Impromptu sur un thème favori de Paganini
 Op. 274, Souvenir de Contemporains, 3 Rondeaux Brillante & Facile sur des Motifs Favoris de Notre Tems (Solo & Duet Versions)
 Op. 275, 3 Thèmes choisis de 'Robert le Diable'
 Op. 276, Sérénade vénitienne, Divertissement Concertant on a Barcarolle for 3 Voices - Accompanied by Variations brillantes For Piano, Flute, Clarinet, & Cello in A major
 Op. 277, Le Chiron Musical (or Collection des Compositions Instructives) for Piano 4-Hands
 Op. 278, Rondo en Bolero in D major
 Op. 279, Rondino No.19 on 2 Favorite Motifs from the Opera 'Zampa'
 Op. 280, Grandes variations brillantes, sur une marche anglaise : pour le pianoforte avec accompagnement d’orchestre ou de quatuor, (ad libitum) (Pub. by Artaria in Vienna around 1832)
 Op. 281, Introduction, variations et presto finale sur 'Norma' in F major for piano and orchestra or string quartet ad libitum
 Op. 282, Le Cornet de Postillon, Variations on a Theme of Rossini
 Op. 283, Grand rondeau brillant for piano and orchestra in F major
 Op. 284, Rondino No.20 on Schubert's "Das Ständchen" in C major
 Op. 285, Variations sur un theme de 'Montecchi e Capuleti' in B♭ Major (2 Piano & Piano Solo Versions)
 Op. 286, Grand Rondo Brillante in C major
 Op. 287, 3 Ariette Italienne for Tenor Voice & Piano
 Op. 288, 6 Divertissements en forme de Rondeaux
 Op. 289, Piano trio no. 4 in A minor (Published by Simrock in 1834)
 Op. 290, La Douceur, Rondo Elegant
 Op. 291, Grand Rondo for Piano 4-Hands
 Op. 292, Variations brillantes sur un thême original in F Major
 Op. 293, La Rivalité for Piano 4-Hands
 Op. 294, Grand Potpourri in A Major for Piano, Flute, Violin, Alto, & Cello
 Opus Numbers 227-229 & 295-297 are part of the Collection "Les Pianistes Associes, ou Compositions Brillant et Concertant"
 Op. 295, Grand Trio No. 4 Air from I Montechi e Capuletti with Variations for one piano, 6 hands.
 Op. 296, Polonaise brillante for Piano 6-Hands
 Op. 297, Variations brillantes sur un thème de la Norma de Bellini for Piano 6 Hands
 Op. 298, Grand Potpourri No.3 for 2 Pianos, 6-Hands
 Op. 299, School of Velocity (Die Schule der Geläufigkeit)
 Op. 300, The Art of Preluding in 120 Examples (Part 2 of Introduction to Extemporaneous Performance Op. 200)
 Op. 301, Variations sur une valse de Reissiger (La Dernière Pensée de Weber)
 Op. 302, Thême italien varié
 Op. 303, Introduction et Variations brillantes sur un thème de Vivenot
 Op. 304, Variations pour le Pianoforte et Violon concertant sur Le vieux Tambour de Lafont
 Op. 305, L’Espagnole
 Op. 306, Souvenirs du jeune âge
 Op. 307, Variations Brillantes on a Theme from the Opera 'Le Serment' for Piano 4-Hands
 Op. 308, Variations on an Original Theme
 Op. 309, Introduction & Variations in G major on a Theme from 'Le Pre aux Clercs' for Piano, Violin, & Cello (Herold)
 Op. 310, Variations Brillantes on "Dans Cette Belle" from the Opera 'Le Serment'
 Op. 311, 2 Rondeaux on Themes from 'Le Pré aux Clercs'
 Op. 312, Variations on "A la Fleur du Bel Age" from the Opera 'Le Pre aux Clercs' for Piano 4-Hands (Herold)
 Op. 313, The Young Pianist, 2 Sonatines Faciles (C major, & G major)
 Op. 314, Grande polonaise brillante précédée d’une introduction pour le pianoforte et violon concertant. (Simrock, Bonn, 1840s),
 Op. 315, 3 cadenzas to Beethoven's Piano Concerto n.1 in C major
 Op. 316, Dix petits rondeaux doigtés pour le piano; ou, amusemens utiles et agréables sur des motifs favoris, pour la jeunesse (Published 1830s)
 Op. 317, Introduction, thème et variations pour piano sur un thème original (pub. by Schuberth of Leipzig in the 1830s)
 Op. 318, 6 graduals, for SATB and organ
 Op. 319, Variations sur la Valse de Robert le diable
 Op. 320, Variations
 Op. 321, Rondo brillant for four-hand piano
 Op. 322, Rondo in B♭ Major for Piano Solo
 Op. 323, l'Allégresse, Rondo for the piano. (published by Schuberth of Leipzig around 1850.)
 Op. 324, Variations Brillantes on a Waltz of Lanner
 Op. 325, Tre fantasie eleganti : dall'Elisir d'amore di Donizetti
 Op. 326, Trois thèmes favoris de l'opéra Zampa de Hérold : variés pour le piano forte
 Op. 327, 3 Fantasies on Donizetti's Opera 'Parisina' (Solo & Duet Versions)
 Op. 328, 3 Fantasies on 'Il Furioso all' Isola di St. Domingo' Solo & Duet Versions
 Op. 329, Variations on a Theme from De Marschner's Opera 'Hans Heiling' for Piano 4-Hands
 Op. 330, Tausend Tonblumen 
 Op. 331, Grande Sonate No.3 in B♭ major for Piano 4-Hands
 Op. 332, Variations brillantes sur 'Robert le diable'
 Op. 333, Les Elegantes (3 Bks.)
 Bk. 1 - Sur la Tyrolienne Favorite, Almalied
 Bk. 2 - Sur la Sonnambula
 Bk. 3 - Sur un Valse Favorite
 Op. 334, Souvenir de Peste, Variations sur un Valse: Erinnerung an Pest de J. Strauss
 Op. 335, the School of Legato and Staccato (Die Schule des Legato und Staccato)
 Op. 336, Fantasie on Cherubini's Opera 'Ali Baba'
 Op. 337, Études quotidiennes (Tägliche Studien)
 Op. 338, Grandes variations de concert sur un thême original in D major
 Op. 339, Drey brillante Fantasien über die beliebtesten Motive aus Franz Schubert's Werken : für Pianoforte und Physharmonica, oder 2 Pianoforte (or horn and piano)
 Op. 340, Variations of J. Strauss's 'Pfennig Waltz'
 Op. 341, Variations brillantes sur un thème favori de l'opéra Hans Heiling de Henri Marschner
 Op. 342, 3 Fantasies on Bellini's Opera 'Beatrice di Tenda' (Solo & Duet Versions)
 Op. 343, 3 Thêmes Favoris de l'Opéra 'L'Estocq' variés
 in G major
 in F major
 in C major
 Op. 344, Trois rondinos non difficiles : sur des motifs favoris de l'opéra Lestocq d'Auber : pour le piano-forte
 Op. 345, Fantasia for piano in D minor (republished 1973)
 Op. 346, Fantasie on the Opera 'Lestocq'
 Op. 347, Variations on a Theme from 'Lestocq' in A major
 Op. 348, Grand exercice en forme de fantaisie improvisée in E minor
 Op. 349, Tre Sonatine for piano
 Op. 350, Le Dernier Soupir de Hérold, Variations on a Theme of Hérold
 Op. 351, Neujahrgeschenk Fantasie
 Op. 352, Souvenir de Boieldieu (Variations in B♭ Major)
 Op. 353, Variations Brillantes on 'Conversations Walzer'
 Op. 354, Amusement des Pianistes, Collection de Morceaux Agreables & Brillantes, 8 Bks.
 Op. 355, The School of Embellishments Ecole des Ornamens
 Op. 356, Variations brillantes sur un thème italien favori : pour le piano-forte, op. 356 = Vien quà Dorina bella = Komm, liebe holde Kleine
 Op. 357, Themes Italiens, Variations for Piano 4-Hands
 Op. 358, Duo Concertant in B♭ Major for 2 Pianos
 Op. 359, First Lessons for Beginners, 50 Exercises, Studies, & Preludes, 2 Bks.
 Op. 360, Grande Fantasie on the Opera 'Gustave'
 Op. 361, Introduction & Variations Brillantes on a Theme from the Opera 'La Medicine sans Medecin'
 Op. 362, Rondo brillante & non difficile on a Theme from the Opera 'La Medicine sans Medecin'
 Op. 363, Introduction & Variations on the Duo "Suoni la Tromba e Intrepido" from the Opera 'I Puritani'
 Op. 364, Grand exercice pour le pianoforté
 Op. 365, School of Virtuosos (Schule des Virtuosen)
 Op. 366, Variations Brillantes on a Theme from Lobe's Opera 'La Princesse de Grenade' in C Major
 Op. 367, Rondoletto Elegant on a Theme from Lobe's Opera 'La Princesse de Grenade'
 Op. 368, Nocturnes (8)
 Op. 369, Gran capriccio di bravura ossia studio per il piano-forte
 Op. 370, Variations brillantes on a Theme from the Opera 'I Puritani'
 Op. 371, 2 Rondolettos faciles on Themes from the Opera 'I Puritani' (D & C Major)
 Op. 372, Six galops en forme de rondeaux : sur des motifs favoris
 Op. 373, Ten brilliant rondos founded on favorite Italian airs; composed and arr. for 2 performers on the piano forte
 Op. 374, Trois Rondos faciles et brillants : pour flûte ou violon et piano (in C, D and G major)
 Op. 375, Introduction & Variations Brillantes on a Theme from the Opera 'I Puritani'
 Op. 376, Fantaisie et variations sur 'I puritani' for Piano 4-Hands
 Op. 377, Fantasy and Variations on Persiani's Ines de Castro
 Op. 378, Valse brillante in A♭ major
 Op. 379, Flore théâtrale (or Fantasies Brillantes) on Modern Operas
 Op. 380, Exercise of scales in thirds in all major and minor keys : for the pianoforte
 Op. 381, 3 Serenades on Themes of Rossini
 Op. 382, 2 Fantasies Brillantes on Themes from Carafa's Opera 'La Prison d'Edimburg'
 Op. 383, 3 Fantaisies on Themes from Donizetti's Opera 'Lucia di Lammermoor'
 Op. 384, Grandes Variations on an Air from the Opera 'Le Cheval de Bronze'
 Op. 385, Récréations de la jeunesse : douze rondeaux instructifs et agréables sur des thèmes modernes et favoris : pour le piano
 Op. 386, Souvenir de Bellini
 Op. 387, 3 Fantaisies on Themees from Donizetti's Opera 'Lucrezia Borgia'
 Op. 388, Etudes Preparatoires et Progressives
 Op. 389, Hommage aux Graces, 3 Rondeaux on Favorite Themes
 Op. 390, Three sonatinas for violin and piano. (Published by Diabelli in Vienna in 1838)
 Op. 391, Grande Rondeau-Polonaise in E♭ Major for Piano & Orchestra
 Op. 392, Der Abend und die Nacht
 Op. 393, 3 Fantaisies on Themes from Donizetti's Opera 'Marino Faliero'
 Op. 394, Fantasie & Variations on the l'Air National Russe 'Dieu Conserve l'Empereur'
 Op. 395, Fantasie & Variations on a Theme from the Opera 'Le Cheval de Bronze' for Piano 4-Hands
 Op. 396, Impromptu on a Theme from Halevy's Opera 'La Juive'
 Op. 397, Bijoux Teatrales (or Nouvelle Collection de Rondeaux, Variations, & Impromptus on Themes from New Operas) (comprises many books)
 Op. 398, Le Gout Moderne for Piano 4-Hands (comprises many books)
 Op. 399, Die Schule der linken Hand auf dem Piano-Forte, oder: 10 grosse Uebungen
 Op. 400, School of Fugue-Playing
 Op. 401, Divertissement sur les motifs les plus favoris de l'opéra La juive de Halévy
 Op. 402, Le petit artiste au salon musical : six morceaux faciles sur des thèmes favoris : pour le piano
 Op. 403, Romance & Rondo on Themes from the Opera 'Les Huguenots'
 Op. 404, Introduction et variations brillantes sur 'Les Huguenots'
 Op. 405, Grand Rondeau
 Op. 406, Festal March, on the Opening of the Booksellers' Exchange in Leipzig (Solo & Duet Versions) (published as Op.409)
 Op. 407, Scherzo Brillante on Themes from the Opera 'Les Huguenots'
 Op. 408, Andante Sentimental on Themes from the Opera 'Les Huguenots'
 Op. 409, Études spéciales: 50 grandi studi di perfezionamento per piano forte (pub. Milano : Gio. Canti; in the 1800s)
 Op. 410, Six sonatines faciles et doigtées : pour le piano-forte
 Op. 411, Introduction & Rondo
 Op. 412, 3 Rondos brillantes on Russian National Themes
 Op. 413, Souvenir de Mon Premier Voyage en Saxe, Fantasie Brillante
 Opus Numbers 414-416 comprise the collection "Album Musical"
 Op. 414, Rondo élégant
 Op. 415, Rondo militaire
 Op. 416, Rondo gracieux
 Op. 417, Rondo Brillante on Themes from the Opera 'Les Huguenots'
 Op. 418, Impromptu in the Form of a Rondo on a Theme from the Opera 'Les Huguenots'
 Op. 419, Huit rondinos agréables et brillans sur des motifs les plus favoris. (Bonn, N. Simrock (1836?))
 Op. 420, Sixty lessons : arranged in an easy and progressive manner for the piano forte : to facilitate the progress of young scholars, with fingerings to each lesson. (New York: Firth & Hall (1830s?))
 Op. 421, Introduction & Rondo martial on a Theme from the Opera 'Les Huguenots'
 Op. 422, Introduction & Rondo brillante on a Theme from the Opera 'Les Huguenots' for Piano 4-Hands
 Op. 423, Rondoletto on a Theme from the Opera 'Les Huguenots'
 Op. 424, Caprice brillant sur motifs de 'Les Huguenots'
 Op. 425, Rondino scherzando on a Theme from the Opera 'Les Huguenots'
 Op. 426, Rondeau sentimental sur l'air favori Isle of beauty, fare thee well: pour le pianoforte
 Op. 427, Introduction & Variations brillantes on Themes of Reissiger
 Op. 428, L'Echo des Alpes Suisses Introduction & Variations brillantes on a Swiss Theme
 Op. 429, Impromptu brillant on a Swiss Theme
 Op. 430, Nachtwändler, Variations on a Waltz of Strauss
 Op. 431, Eisenbahn Variationen Variations on a Waltz by Strauss
 Op. 432, 24 Canzonette italiane(??) for Voice & Piano
 Op. 433, Études préparatoires et progressives pour le Piano pour servir au développement du mécanisme et de l'expression des Pianistes avancés
 Op. 434, Les quatre saisons
 Op. 435, Recreations Musicales, 6 Melodies of Bellini
 Op. 436, Rondoletto Scherzando
 Op. 437, Fantaisie on Themes from Donizetti's Opera ' La Campanello' (Solo & Duet Versions)
 Op. 438, Les progrès du jeune pianiste : huit thêmes favoris variés, composés pour le piano à l'usage des jeunes élèves avancés
 Op. 439, 4 Sonatinas for piano
 Op. 440, 4 Melodies Varies
 Op. 441, Fantaisie on Donizetti's Opera 'Betly' (Solo & Duet Versions)
 Op. 442, Introduction & Variations Brillantes on 'Choeur du Pirate'
 Op. 443, Variations Brillantes on a Theme from Halevy's Opera 'L'Eclair'
 Op. 444, Rondo Brillant on a Favorite Italian Theme
 Op. 445, Introduction & Variations on Themes from the Opera 'Beatice di Tenda'
 Op. 446, 3 Fantasies Brillantes on Themes of Mercadante
 Op. 447, Introduction & Variations Brillantes on the Cavatine "Senti tu Comeio Sento"
 Op. 448, Caprice et variations brillantes : sur le thème Versàr potrà le lagrime de l'opéra: Torquato Tasso de Donizetti
 Op. 449, Improvisation on J. Strauss's Kronungs-Walzer
 Op. 450, Fantasie Lyrique on a Swiss Theme
 Op. 451, Impromptu Brillant & Militaire on a March from Donizetti's 'Sultan Mahmoud'
 Op. 452, Introduction & Grand Variations on an Original Theme
 Op. 453, 110 easy and progressive exercises, for pianoforte.
 Op. 454, 18 Rondeaux et variations sur des thêmes favoris
 Op. 455, National airs
 Op. 456, Rondo Brillant, "Son nom"
 Op. 457, The Spirit's Song by Shakespeare
 Op. 458, 3 Rondinos élégans sur des motifs favoris de Beethoven
 Op. 459, 5 Original Quadrilles
 Op. 460, Rondo élégant sur l'air favori Wo der Wiese grünes Band de l'opéra: Des Adlers Horst de Gläser : pour le pianoforte
 Op. 461, 3 Duos 3 Morceaux Faciles for Piano 4-Hands
 Op. 462, Rondo on the Theme from Auber's 'L'Ambassadrice'
 Op. 463, Theater-Bibliothek : für die Jugend
 Op. 464, 2 Rondinos Brillantes on Themes from Auber's 'L'Ambassadrice'
 Op. 465, Fantasie Brillante on Motifs from Auber's 'L'Ambassadrice'
 Op. 466, Hommage a Beethoven, 6 Rondos
 Op. 467, Fantaisie sur Air Ecossais
 Op. 468, Fantasie brillante sur des airs Irlandais
 Op. 469, Divertissement Brillant on a Theme from Auber's 'L'Ambassadrice' for Piano 4-Hands
 Op. 470, Souvenir du Voyage du Rhin, Fantasie Brillante
 Op. 471, Souvenir de Paris, Fantasie
 Op. 472, Recompenses Musical for the Young for Piano 4-Hands
 Op. 473, Rondo Elegant on a French Romance
 Op. 474, Fantasie & Variations on a Theme from Adam's 'Postillon de Longjomeau'
 Op. 475, Rondoletto Brillante on "La Cachucha"
 Op. 476, Divertisement Brillante on Adam's 'Postillon de Longjomeau' for Piano 4-Hands
 Op. 477, Introduction & Variations Brillantes on Adam's 'Postillon de Longjomeau' for Piano 4-Hands
 Op. 478, Rondo Brillant on Adam's 'Postillon de Longjomeau' for Piano 4-Hands
 Op. 479, 3 Rondos Faciles & Brillantes on Favorite Themes
 Op. 480, 6 Rondos for Piano 4-Hands
 Op. 481, 50 Practice Pieces for Beginners
 Op. 482, Invitation à la danse Divertimento
 Op. 483, 2 Esquisses charactéristiques sur des Thèmes de Bellini
 Op. 484, Rondino grazioso ou Impromptu brillant sur un thème italien favori : pour le piano
 Op. 485, Variations sur les Étoiles d'amour de Joh. Strauss sen.
 Op. 486, Rondino brillant sur la valse Le bal des artistes de Strauss. (Paris, Schonenberger. 1830s?)
 Op. 487, Rondeau brillant sur la 'Marche du Mariage du Duc d'Orléans'
 Op. 488, Marche du Couronnement de la Reine Victoria
 Op. 489, Quick Step du Couronnement de la Reine Victoria
 Op. 490, Introduction et variations brillantes : sur le galop favori de l'opéra Lucia de Lammermoor de Donizetti
 Op. 491, Rondeau brillant sur des Walses favorites de Jos. Lanner
 Op. 492, Variations sur Rosa Valse
 Op. 493, Fantaisie brillante sur des thèmes de l'opéra Le nozze di Figaro
 Op. 494, Fantasie Brillante sur Motifs de l'Italiana in Algeri
 Op. 495, Études progressives et brillantes
 Op. 496, Rondino sur la walse favorite de La reine Victoria
 Op. 497, Rondo on Hummel's Waltzes
 Op. 498, Les plaisirs du salon
 Op. 499, Exercise in 2 Octaves
 Op. 500, Complete theoretical and practical piano forte school, from the first rudiments … to the highest … state of cultivation …
 Op. 501, 24 Very Easy Preludes in the Most Useful Keys
 Op. 502, 3 Thèmes variés
 Op. 503, Badinage Musical, Rondo de Galop
 Op. 504, Fantaisie et Variations Brillantes sur la Marche de « Moises »
 Op. 505, Six rondeaux instructifs et agréables pianoforte composés et doigtés à l'usage des élèves avancés et de la jeunesse
 Op. 506, 3 Rondinos sur des thèmes du Domino Noir d'Auber
 Op. 507, Fantaisie Romantique sur Le Domino Noir d'Auber
 Op. 508, Rondino gracieux sur les valses de Lanner
 Op. 509, Caprice sur un thème du Domino Noir d'Auber 
 Op. 510, Fantaisie sur les Saisons de Haydn
 Op. 511, Duo Le Domino Noir d'Auber for Piano 4-Hands
 Op. 512, Grande Fantaisie pour piano et harpe
 Op. 513, Marche pour le Jour de Naissance de S.M. la Reine Victoria
 Op. 514, Quickstep pour le Jour de Naissance de S.M. la Reine Victoria
 Op. 515, Fantaisie sur La Création de Haydn
 Op. 516, Reminiscences from the Opera 'Guido et Geneva', 2 Bks.
 Op. 517, Reminiscences from the Opera 'Le Domino Noir', Fantasie for Piano 4-Hands
 Op. 518, Rondinetto on El Zapateado
 Op. 519, 6 Rondinos faciles sur des valses de J. Strauss
 Op. 520, 3 Rondinos Brillants sur des thèmes russes, espagnols et norwégiens
 Op. 521, Rondinetto Facile on a March of J. Strauss (Solo & Duet Versions)
 Op. 522, 3 Rondinos faciles sur 'Gemma e Giuramento'
 Op. 523, Impromptu Sentimental "Oh Nume Benefico"
 Op. 524, Variations faciles sur "Gott Erhalte" for Piano 4-Hands
 Op. 525, 3 Quadrilles (Solo & Duet Versions)
 Op. 526, Coronation Quadrille (Solo & Duet Version)
 Op. 527, Variations Faciles on a Theme from Haydn's 'The Creation' for Piano 4-Hands
 Op. 528, Rondino Facile sur un thème de La Création de Haydn for Piano 4-Hands
 Op. 529, 3 Morceaux de Salon, Brillants, et Caractéristiques
 Op. 530, Marche pour le Prince de Cambridge (Solo & Duet Versions)
 Op. 531, Marche pour la Coronation de S.M. l'Empereur d'Autriche à Milan (Solo & Duet Versions)
 Op. 532, Fantaisie Expressive on 'Torquato Tasso'
 Op. 533, Rondino Facile on a Theme Militaire of Beethoven (Solo & Duet Versions)
 Op. 534, 3 Fantaisies Brillantes sur Robert Devereux
 Op. 535, 2 Airs Russes Variés for Piano 4-Hands
 Op. 536, 12 Rondinos Faciles sur des thèmes écossais
 Op. 537, Nocturne Sentimental sur un thème de Strauss
 Op. 538, 3 Rondolettos Faciles sur des thèmes favoris
 Op. 539, 1re Grande Ouverture, Irlandaise (Solo & Duet Versions)
 Op. 540, 3 Fantaisies Brillantes sur l'opéra de Marschner 'Baber'
 Op. 541, 2 Prussian National Themes with Variations
 Op. 542, Variations et Finale on a Prussian National Theme
 Op. 543, 2e Grande Ouverture, Écossaise (Solo & Duet Versions)
 Op. 544, 3e Grande Ouverture, Anglaise(Solo & Duet Version)
 Op. 545, Hommage à la Reine Victoria, Fantaisie Brillante
 Op. 546, 12 Rondinos Faciles sur Fleurs Anglais, Ecossais, et Irlandais
 Op. 547, 3 Rondolettos Elegans sur des thèmes divers
 Op. 548, Rondo sur des thèmes de l'opéra 'Le tsar et le charpentier' (cf. Zar und Zimmermann by Albert Lortzing)
 Op. 549, Fantaisie sur des thèmes de l'opéra 'Le tsar et le charpentier'
 Op. 550, Impromptu et valse sur des thèmes de l'opéra 'Le tsar et le charpentier'
 Op. 551, Rondoletto sur un thème de l'opéra 'Le tsar et le charpentier'
 Op. 552, 3 Themes & Variations for Piano 4-Hands
 Op. 553, Sechs tägliche Oktav-Uebungen in fortschreitender Schwierigkeit (Six Octave Studies in Progressive Difficulty) für das Pianoforte
 Op. 554, 6 New Royal Quadrilles (Solo & Duet Versions)
 Op. 555, 8 scherzi capricciosi per il pianoforte
 Op. 556, 3 Favorite Airs & Variations
 Op. 557, 6 Ecossais Themes & Variations
 Op. 558, 6 Songs for Voice & Piano (Words by Mrs. Hemans)
 Op. 559, Impromptu varié on a Theme of Mozart
 Op. 560, Le Coureur Exercise Brillante
 Op. 561, 3 Rondolettos Faciles on Favorite Themes (Solo & Duet Versions)
 Op. 562, Collection of Sacred Music for Voice & Piano
 Op. 563, Impromptû brillant sur les Danses nationales éspagnoles : La Tiranna de Cadiz et la Gitana, dansée par Dlle Marie Taglioni (Breitkopf, 1839)
 Op. 564, Rondoletto on "Sound the Loud Timbrel" (Solo & Duet Versions)
 Op. 565, Velocity Studies
 Op. 566, Variations brillante on "Adeste Fideles"
 Op. 567, 6 Fantasies brillantes on Themes Ecossais & Irlandais (Solo & Duet Versions)
 Op. 568, 2 Rondinos Faciles sur Mazurka et Carneval
 Op. 569, 2 Fantasies on Handel's 'Alexander's Feast' & 'Messiah'
 Op. 570, Rondino brillant sur le choeur 'A travers ces rochers'
 Op. 571, Impromptu sur la choeur des Fées
 Op. 572, Reminiscences on the Opera 'Le Lac de fées', Fantasie
 Op. 573, Reminiscences on the Opera 'Le Lac de fées', Morceau de Salon
 Op. 574, Reminiscences de l'Opéra 'Le Lac des Fées'
 Op. 575, Die Schule des Vortrags und der Verzierungen
 Op. 576, Morceaux élégans on Favorite Themes
 Op. 577, 3 Amusements de Salon
 Op. 578, 6 Original Galops
 Op. 579, 2 Original Quadrilles
 Op. 580, Impromptu Sentimental on a Religious Song
 Op. 581, Rondino Facile on a Pastorale from Handel's 'Messiah' for Piano 4-Hands
 Op. 582, Rondo Elegant on the Opera 'Zanetta'
 Op. 583, Douze rondeaux amusants et instructifs pour le pianoforte à quatre mains, sur des thèmes les plus favoris des opéras français et italiens (Bronsvic, G. M. Meyer, jr., 1840s)
 Op. 584, Kleine theoretisch-praktische Pianoforte-Schule für Anfänger Pianoforte Primer, an Easy Instruction Book
 Op. 585, Rondino facile on 'Le Krakoviac' (Solo & Duet Version)
 Op. 586, 3 Rondinos on the Opera 'Zanetta'
 Op. 587, Fantasie brillante on the Opera 'Zanetta' for Piano 4-Hands
 Op. 588, Variations faciles on the Russian Theme "Dieu Conserve" (Solo & Duet Versions)
 Op. 589, 4 Morceaux faciles on English Themes for Piano 4-Hands
 Op. 590, 3 Themes & Variations on the Opera 'Le Sherif'
 Op. 591, Scherzo brillant on the Opera 'Le Sherif' for Piano 4-Hands
 Op. 592, Impromptu pastoral, "Poor Shepherd's Maid"
 Op. 593, XII rondinos faciles et doigtés pour le piano sur des motifs favoris de Mozart et Rossini
 Op. 594, Victoria Quadrille Quadrille pour les Noces de S.M. la Reine Victoria (Solo & Duet Versions)
 Op. 595, Marche Solenne pour les Noces de S.M. la Reine Victoria (Solo & Duet Versions)
 Op. 596, Der Engel der Geduld, Chanson Allemande Voice & Piano
 Op. 597, 2 Rondeaux élégants
 Op. 598, Galop brillant
 Op. 599, Practical Exercises for Beginners - Études, (Erster Wiener Lehrmeister im Pianofortespiel ) Could be used by beginner pianist
 Op. 600, School of Practical Composition (c.1835, 3 vols)
 Op. 601, Fantasia on Beethoven's 'Fidelio'
 Op. 602, Reverie sur la Romance Napolitaine Beppa
 Op. 603, Préludes et Fugues for Organ with Obligatory Pedal (1836)
 Op. 604, Huit nocturnes romantiques de différents caractères
 Op. 605, 2 Grand Fantasies on Nicolai's Opera 'Templario'
 Op. 606, 18 petits rondeaux et variations sur des mélodies populaires allemandes [musique] Deutsche Voklsgesänge : pour le piano pour faciliter les progrès des élèves avancés
 Op. 607, Préludes et Fugues pour l'orgue avec pédale obligée en la mineur (1838)
 Op. 608, Variations Brillantes sur Derniere Pensee de Weber
 Op. 609, 24 Airs populaires en rondeaux The Pianist's Library, 24 Very Easy Pieces (Solo, 4-Hand, & 6-Hand Versions)
 Op. 609, Les trois Sœurs, 45 rondinos for piano 6-hands based on music by various composers
 Op. 610, Rondo élégant
 Op. 611, Fantasie marine on Italian Themes
 Op. 612, Impromptu sentimental
 Op. 613, School of Expression (On National Airs, 4 Bks.)
 Op. 614, 3 Grand Fantasies on 'La vestale' (Solo & Duet Versions)
 Op. 615, Rondo de Salon
 Op. 616, 6 Rondos brillantes
 Op. 617, Variations brillants
 Op. 618, Douze rondeaux amusans : pour le pianoforte à quatre mains : sur des thèmes allemands et italiens
 Op. 619, Variations faciles, March in Blue Beard (Solo & Duet Versions)
 Op. 620, Grande Fantasie on the Opera 'Oberto'
 Op. 621, 12 Grande Fantasies on the Opera 'Cristina di Svezia'
 Op. 622, 3 Melodies variées, Les Fleurs d'Angleterre
 Op. 623, 3 Melodies variées, Les Fleurs d'Ecosse
 Op. 624, 3 Melodies Variees, Les Fleurs d'Irlande
 Op. 625, Productions de salon (Fantasies for piano and violin on various themes by Donizetti, composed with Leon Herz - his opp. 13–18.)
 Op. 626, 3 Fantaisies on Donizetti's Opera 'La fille du Regiment' (Solo & Duet Versions)
 Op. 627, 12 Préludes for Organ, Harmonium or Piano
 Op. 628, 2 Rondo Brillants
 Op. 629, 6 Amusings Rondolettos
 Op. 630, Grande Fantasie (2nd Irish Fantasia)
 Op. 631, Grande Fantasie (2nd Scotch Fantasia)
 Op. 632, 12 Etudes
 Op. 633, Air Varie
 Op. 634, Air Varie
 Op. 635, 18 Rondos Faciles
 Op. 636, Preliminary School of Finger Dexterity - 24 studii della piccola velocita per pianoforte… (German title from edition at Library of Congress - Vorschule zur Fingerfertigkeit auf dem Pianoforte.)
 Op. 637, 4 Brillant Fantasies on the Opera 'Rolla' (Solo & Duet Versions)
 Op. 638, Belle Viennoise, rondoletto brillant sur Anna, polka favorite de Strauss, pour piano (pub. Philadelphia, A. Fiot, 196 Chestnut St., Importer of music & musical instruments; New York, W. Dubois, 315 Broadway ca. 1850)
 Op. 639, Grand Duet
 Op. 640, Grand Duet
 Op. 641, Fantasie Brillante, Hommage au Prince Albert
 Op. 642, Grand Morceaux de Concert
 Op. 643, Grande Fantasie
 Op. 644, Grande Fantasie
 Op. 645, Fantasie sur Cimarosa
 Op. 646, 6 Rondeaux militaires
 Op. 647, Nocturne pour le piano (Vienna [1843])
 Op. 648, L'Impressions dans l'Opera, 6 Fantasies
 Op. 649, Variations Brillantes
 Op. 650, Concertino for Piano & Orchestra
 Op. 651, Charmes de la Danse
 Op. 652, 2 Grandes Fantasies on 'Les Martyrs' (Solo & Duet Versions)
 Op. 653, Fantasie Brillante on English Airs
 Op. 654, Grand Fantasia (3rd Irish Fantasia)
 Op. 655, 3 Fantasies Brillantes on the Opera 'Adelia'
 Op. 656, 3 Rondos Faciles
 Op. 657, 6 Rondos Brillantes
 Op. 658, Impromptu sur la Romanesca for Piano 4-Hands
 Op. 659, Grand Fantasia (3rd Scotch Fantasie)
 Op. 660, Rondo de Chasse
 Op. 661, 10 Rondolettos
 Op. 662, Graduale for Soprano & Organ
 Op. 663, Fantasie Brillante
 Op. 664, Fantasie Brillante
 Op. 665, 6 Rondinos
 Op. 666, 6 Rondos Brillantes
 Op. 667, Tableaux Mélodiques
 Op. 668, Souvenir de Weber Fantaisie Brillante sur 'Der Freyschutz'
 Op. 669, La Mazurka
 Op. 670, 12 Ecossais Brillantes
 Op. 671, Scherzo
 Op. 672, 24 Etudes élégantes
 Op. 673, 2 Rondinos sur les Diamans de la Couronne. Opéra d'Auber
 Op. 674, Fantasie Brillante
 Op. 675, Fantasie Brillante
 Op. 676, Fantaisie Brillante sur les Diamans de la Couronne. Opéra d'Auber
 Op. 677, 2 Quadrilles Faciles
 Op. 678, Bijoux a la Sontag
 Op. 679, Reminiscences de Rossini, 6 Fantasias
 Op. 680, Variations Concertantes for Piano 4-Hands
 Op. 681, Souvenir de Labitzky 3 Rondinos
 Op. 682, 3 Airs Varies
 Op. 683, Mariner's Fantasia
 Op. 684, Aufmunterung zum Fleiss: 24 unterhaltende Übungstücke [für das Pianoforte]
 Op. 685, 6 Menuets
 Op. 686, Grande sonate pour piano et violon (pub. 1842) (Breitkopf & Härtel no. 6676, their publication may be of later date.)
 Op. 687, 3 Pieces Fugitves de Salon
 Op. 688, Melodie Sentimental
 Op. 689, Grande Fantasy on the themes of 'Norma' by Vincenzo Bellini for piano, 6 hands
 Op. 690, 12 Rondinos
 Op. 691, 3 Rondos
 Op. 692, 24 Grand Etudes de Salon
 Op. 693, 4 Airs Varies
 Op. 694, Etudes for the Young, 24 Preludes
 Op. 695, 12 Rondinos
 Op. 696, 60 Preludes
 Op. 697, Fantasie
 Op. 698, 20 Voluntaries (Preludes) for Organ with obligatory pedal
 Op. 699, Études, (Kunst der Fingerfertigkeit )
 Op. 700, Délassement de l'Etude, 12 Rondos Faciles
 Op. 701, 6 Rondinos on the Opera 'Duc d'Olonne'
 Op. 702, Impromptu on the Opera 'Duc d'Olonne'
 Op. 703, Fantasie on the Opera 'Duc d'Olonne' for Piano 4-Hands
 Op. 704, 3 Rondos Brillantes
 Op. 705, 3 Rondos Brillantes
 Op. 706, Variations élégantes pour servir d'Ëtude 24 New Etudes on English Airs
 Op. 707, 4 Fantasies on Scotch & Irish Airs
 Op. 708, 4 Fantasies on Donizetti's Opera 'Linda di Chamounix'
 Op. 709, 18 Rondinos
 Op. 710, Amusement de la Jeunesse, 6 Overtures
 Op. 711, Rondino Brillant sur la Favorite
 Op. 712, Rondino Brillant sur Reine de Cypre
 Op. 713, Pensee Fugitive
 Op. 714, 24 Rondinettos
 Op. 715, Impromptu Orageux
 Op. 716, Grand Duo for Piano 4-Hands
 Op. 717, Grandes Variations for Piano 4-Hands
 Op. 718, 24 Études, (Etüden für die linke Hand )
 Op. 719, Duo for Piano & Harp
 Op. 720, 3 Morceaux Brillantes
 Op. 721, 50 Rondos, La Jeunesse Docile
 Op. 722, 10 Petite Fantaisies on Airs from Mercadantes Operas
 Op. 723, 6 Rondos de Salon
 Op. 724, Fantaisie brillante sur des airs chinois
 Op. 725, 3 Rondos
 Op. 726, Salve Regina : offertorio per coro con accompagnamento di due violini, viole, violoncello e basso, un flauto, due clarinetti, due fagotti e due corni ed anche con accompagnamento di organo o pianoforte
 Op. 727, 12 Etudes for 2 Pianos
 Op. 728, 3 Bluettes de Salon
 Op. 729, Panorama beliebter Melodien aller Nationen Collection of Morceaux Brillantes
 Op. 730, Piano Sonata no. 11 in D, composée et dédié à monsieur le Baron de Lannoy
 Op. 731, Souvenir de Milan, 2 Fantasias
 Op. 732, German Chorus with Solos, "Geist der Harmonie"
 Op. 733, 6 Rondeaux brillants et faciles sur des motifs favoris for Piano 4-Hands
 Op. 734, 3 Aris Varies
 Op. 735, Terzen-Übung und Etude für die Linke Hand (Three etudes for the left hand alone.)
 Op. 736, 3 Fantasias
 Op. 737, Benedicat, Offertorio for 4 Voices & Orchestra
 Op. 738, Quadrille
 Op. 739, Rondoletto sur Part du Diable
 Op. 740, Études, (Kunst der Fingerfertigkeit ) (The Art of Finger Dexterity)
 Op. 741, Les trois amateurs: fantaisies brillantes: à six mains pour le piano (piano six hands)
 Op. 742, 2 Rondeaux brillants sur 'La Part du Diable'
 Op. 743, German Chorus
 Op. 744, Impromptu sur Part du Diable
 Op. 745, Reminiscences sur Part du Diable
 Op. 746, 2 Divertissements sur Part du Diable for Piano 4-Hands
 Op. 747, 3 Divertissements
 Op. 748, Le début, 25 Études
 Op. 749, 25 Studies for Small Hands (Rather More Difficult)
 Op. 750, 10 Morceaux Faciles
 Op. 751, Studies, piano duet
 Op. 752, Fantaisie sur des mélodies de Beethoven
 Op. 753, 30 Etudes Brillants
 Op. 754, 6 Etudes de Salon
 Op. 755, 25 Etudes Melodieux (Etude in A, No. 18 )
 Op. 756, Le Parfait Pianiste: 25 Grandes Études de Salon.
 Op. 757, Offertorio for Soprano & Orchestra
 Op. 758, Rondos on Motives from Wagner Operas
 Op. 759, Variations brillantes et non difficiles Variations on a Theme from the Opera 'Rienzi'
 Op. 760, Ave Maria, Offertorie for Soprano & Orchestra
 Op. 761, Impromptu
 Op. 762, Allegro de Salon
 Op. 763, Scherzino alla Tarentella
 Op. 764, Religion, Poem Allemande for Tenor & Piano
 Op. 765, Étude courante
 Op. 766, Les Guirlandes, 12 Rondinos Faciles & Brillantes on Favorite Themes
 Op. 767, Fleurs de l'expression, 50 studies
 Op. 768, Esercizio Fugato
 Op. 769, 48 Rondinos on Favorite Themes
 Op. 770, 2 Rondolettos on the Opera 'Stradella'
 Op. 771, 24 Rondinos for Piano 4-Hands
 Op. 772, 2 Rondolettos on the Opera 'Les Puits d'Amour'
 Op. 773, Le début du jeune pianiste: 6 rondinos pour le pianoforte.)
 Op. 774, 2 Fantasies Brillantes
 Op. 775, 24 Rondinettos tres Faciles
 Op. 776, Impromptu Fugue for Pianoforte
 Op. 777, 24 Exercises for the Five Fingers.
 Op. 778, 6 Rondinos on the Opera 'Stradella'
 Op. 779, L'infatigable : grande étude de vélocité pour le piano
 Op. 780, Symphony no. 1 in C minor "Grand Symphony"
 Op. 781, Symphony no. 2 (of 6) in D major
 Op. 782, 6 Fantasias on Scotch Airs for Piano Duet
 Op. 783, 2 Rondolettos on a Theme from the Opera 'Le Domino Noir'
 Op. 784, De Profundis, for Chorus & Small Orchestra
 Op. 785, 25 Grand Characteristic Studies
 Op. 786, 6 Fantasias on Irish Themes for Piano Duet
 Op. 787, Galop brillant
 Op. 788, Sonate im Style des Domenico Scarlatti für das Pianoforte
 Op. 789, Scherzino
 Op. 790, Musicalisches Wochenblatt (Collection of Easy Pieces, 52 Numbers in the Year)
 Op. 791, Fleurs Melodiques, 12 Pieces de Differns Caracteres
 Op. 792, Premiers moyens d'acquérir de la dextérité sur le piano, 35 studies
 Op. 792b, Grand exercice des arpèges
 Op. 793, Morceau d'Album
 Op. 794, Le Plaisir du jeune Pianiste : après les premières Leçons; Choix de cent-soixante petites Récréations en formes d'Airs, Fantaisies, Rondolettos, Transcriptions, Chansons sans Paroles, Danses, Scherzos, Variations, etc. etc. Sur les Mélodies les plus Favorites
 Op. 795, 8 Morceaux de Salon (Chanson sans Paroles, No. 1)
 Op. 796, Fantasie sur l'Ode Symphony 'Columbus' de David (Solo & Duet Versions)
 Op. 797, 10 Grandes Fantasies Concertantes for 2 Pianos
 Op. 798, 6 Divertimentos for Piano 6-Hands
 Op. 799, 6 Pange Lingua for SATB
 Op. 800, 2 Fantasies on Motifs from the Opera 'La Fille du Regiment'
 Op. 801, L'Agreable Union, Soirees Amusantes . 6 Rondeaux Brillante & Facile for Piano 4-Hands
 Op. 802, Exercices pratiques des doigts
 Op. 803, Vierzig leichte Tonstücke in fortschreitender Ordnung : für Anfänger im Pianofortespiel; als erstes Hülfsmittel zur Förderung des Notenlesens, der Fingerfertigkeit und des Vortrags
 Op. 804, Album élégant des Dames-Pianistes, 24 Morceaux mélodieux
 Op. 805, 3 Rondeaux, Galops brillants
 Op. 806, Rondeau brillant
 Op. 807, Neue Studien
 Op. 808, Rondeau brillant de Salon (Cassel: Luckhardt, 1850)
 Op. 809, Heliose an Abälards Grabe
 Op. 810, Rondeau Brillant
 Op. 811, Beliebte Thema mit Variationen im brillanten Salon-Styl
 Op. 812, Offertorium, 'Salva nos Domine', Bass and Organ
 Op. 813, Fantasia on the Ruins [of Athens?]
 Op. 814, Brilliante Fantasie on Don Juan
 Op. 815, Umriss der ganzen Musikgeschichite (2 vols.)
 Op. 816, Quatuor concertant n° 2, 4 Pianos
 Op. 817, 80 Leichte und fortschreitende Anfängerstücke
 Op. 818, 50 Studien zur Gelenkigkeit der Finger
 Op. 819, 28 melodisch-rhythmische Studien
 Op. 820, 90 Daily Studies
 Op. 821, 160 Eight-Measure Exercises - Études, ( Achttaktige Übungen ) (160 Eight-Measure Studies)
 Op. 822, Gradus ad Parnassum; collection de grands exercices de tout genre dans le style élégant et dans le style sévère, pour le piano
 Op. 823, "The Little Pianist"
 Op. 824, Praktische Taktschule = (École pratique de la mesure) für Pianoforte zu 4 Händen
 Op. 825 (André), Amusement des jeunes amateurs, petites et brillantes récréations en forme de rondos et variations pour piano composés par Charles Czerny, Op. 825
 Elfin Waltz
 National Schottisch
 Montecchi E Capuletti
 Puritani, Polacca
 Aurora Waltz
 Zapateado
 Russian Hymn
 Magic Flute
 Wm. Tell
 Don Juan
 Petit Tambour
 Carnaval De Venise
 Op. 825 (Cranz), - Kinderklavierschule
 Op. 825 (Thieme), - Kleine und brillante Unterhaltungstücke, Piano 4 Hands
 Op. 827, Rondinos et variations, Piano 4 Hands
 Op. 828, Rondinos et variations élégants
 Op. 829, Melodisch-brillante Studien
 Op. 830, Saltarella capriciosa
 Op. 832, Morceaux de caractère
 L'Agitation
 Romance
 Confiance
 Réjouissance
 Persuasion
 Les Chasseurs
 La Mazourka
 Les Papillons
 Courante
 Sonnerie harmonique
 Jubilation
 Saltarelle
 Op. 833, 3 Rondinos
 Op. 834, Die höhere Stufe der Virtuosität : neue Folge der Schule der Geläufigkeit für das Pianoforte
 Op. 835, Méthode pour les enfants
 Op. 836, Krause-Etudes
 Op. 837, Das moderne Klavierspiel
 Op. 838, Studien zur Kenntnis aller Akkorde des Generalbasses
 Op. 840, 50 exercices progressifs dans tous les tons
 Op. 841, 15 rondinos for solo piano on beloved themes
 Op. 842, 6 Morceaux faciles
 Op. 843, 10 Pièces
 Polka bohémienne hongroise
 Defilier-Marsch
 Mädele, ruck, ruck, ruck
 Die schönsten Augen (Stigelli)
 Torquato Tasso
 An Alexis (Himmel)
 Barcarolle vénitienne
 Les Yeux bleus (Arnaud)
 Polka (Strauss)
 Galop-Rondino
 Op. 844, 20 Rondinos for 2 Pianos
 Op. 845, 12 Grandes Études d'agilité et perfectionnement
 Op. 846, Impromptu
 Op. 848, Nouveaux Exercices Journalier
 Op. 849, 30 études (Studies of Mechanism), introduction to op. 299
 Op. 850, 5 Fantaisies brillantes et concertantes, Piano 8 Hands
 Op. 852, Etude and fugue (Stuttgart: E. Hallberger, 1858)
 Op. 853, Étude en forme de tarantelle
 Op. 854, La Clochette (Bagatelle)
 Op. 855, Études mélodiques, concertantes et faciles, Piano 4 Hands
 Op. 856, The Pianist in the Classical Style (48 Preludes and Fugues)
 Op. 857, Grande fantaisie sur Si j'étais roi, Piano 4 Hands
 Op. 858, 30 études mélodiques et concertantes pour piano
 Op. 860, Obéron (Grand duo brillant et concertant, 2 Pianos)
 Op. 861, 30 Studies for Left hand

Probably without opus
 Letters to a Young Lady on the Art of Playing the Pianoforte
 Variations on the Beloved Sehnsucht Waltz by Ludwig van Beethoven
 Symphony in D (1814?) (Allegro molto quasi presto - Adagio quasi andante in F - Scherzo: Molto presto in D minor - Allegro molto in D)
 Symphony no. 3 in C major?
 Symphony no. 4 in D minor?
 Symphony no. 5 in E (1845) (published Leipzig : MVMC, 2001, c1997)
 Symphony no. 6 in G minor (his last symphony)
 First Piano Concerto, in D minor (1811–12)
 "Nonet" for Cor anglais, Clarinet, Bassoon, Horn, 2 Violins, Viola, Violoncello, Double Bass and Piano (1850)
 Ireland: 2 Popular Irish Airs (1860)
 Paddy Carey
 The Legacy
 Andante e polacca for horn and piano
 Beatus vir : for SATB voices, a cappella (published by New York : Lawson-Gould Music Publishers; Miami, Fla. : Warner Bros. Publications [distributor], 2001.)
 There is, according to a Canadian Broadcasting recording, a "Grand sonata" for violin and piano written in 1807 in A major recorded which may or may not be that which was published in 1842.
 Many string quartets (over 20? Possibly as many as 40)
String quartet in C minor edited by Bernhard Pauler from Sources/Manuscript and published by Amadeus-Verlag, Winterthur in 2006
String quartet no. 20 in C major, 1849: holograph of manuscript score (and parts?) at Library of Congress
String quartet no. 28 in A major, 1851: holograph at Library of Congress
String quartet in A minor: unpublished manuscript at Gesellschaft der Musikfreunde, Vienna
String quartet in D minor: unpublished manuscript at Gesellschaft der Musikfreunde, Vienna
String quartet in D major: unpublished manuscript at Gesellschaft der Musikfreunde, Vienna
String quartet in E minor: unpublished manuscript at Gesellschaft der Musikfreunde, Vienna
Also http://www.concertzender.nl/programmagids.php?date=2003-11-01&month=-44&detail=3228
 From the Altenberg trio site - several unpublished piano trios (22 trios, published and unpublished, in all).
Note:
 A catalog was published in 1834 titled "Carl Czerny's sämmtliche Original-Compositionen von opus 1 bis 300" by Diabelli, a copy of which is owned by The National Library of Canada. This is not a combined score of the 300 works, but a list, possibly with incipits (main themes, first lines/bars of each.)

Czerny's arrangements, editing projects, etc.
Bach keyboard works (some edited, some arranged, a solo keyboard partita into a flute and piano work, for example)
Beethoven symphonies and overtures, sonatas for piano, for violin and for cello (including an arrangement for cello from Violin Sonata No. 9 (Beethoven), »Kreutzer« sonata, by Czerny), and chamber works for larger ensembles
Haydn symphonies
Mozart symphonies among other works (Deutsche Tänze)
Operas by Donizetti and others
Four-hand piano adaptation of the Mozart Requiem

References & Notes

External links
 IMSLP Category: Czerny, Carl, alphabetical list of compositions, at imslp.org
 IMSLP List of compositions by Carl Czerny, by opus number, at imslp.org

 
Czerny, Carl